Pierre Bayen (7 February 1725–14 February 1798) was a French chemist. He analyzed water drunk by the Kingdom of France, and he wrongly suggested that using pewter glasses rendered the water toxic. He became a member of the French Academy of Sciences in 1785 and the Institut de France in 1795. He burned all his papers during the Reign of Terror of 1793-1794. The Lycée Pierre Bayen in Chalons was named in his memory.

References

1725 births
1798 deaths
People from Châlons-en-Champagne
18th-century French chemists
Members of the French Academy of Sciences